Ivan Hladík (born 30 January 1993) is a Slovak footballer who plays as a centre-back for Slovak club club ŠKF Sereď.

Club career
Hladík made his first league appearance for Senica on 23 July 2011, coming as substitute for Jan Kalabiška in the 43rd minute of a 2–3 away loss against Slovan Bratislava.

In June 2016, he was signed by Spartak Trnava.

On 25 January 2021, he joined I liga side Puszcza Niepołomice on a two-year deal. He left the club by mutual consent on 15 February 2022.

On 18 February 2022, Hladík signed a one-and-a-half-year deal with Stal Stalowa Wola. In his league debut on 12 March 2022 against Wisłoka Dębica, he scored Stal’s first goal and was given a red card after a foul on Łukasz Siedlik in a 2–2 draw.

Honours 
 Slovak Super Liga: 2017–18
 A Lyga: 2019
 Lithuanian Football Cup: 2019

References

External links
 
 
 Eurofotbal.cz profile

1993 births
Living people
Association football defenders
Slovak footballers
FK Senica players
TJ Baník Ružiná players
MŠK Rimavská Sobota players
FC Spartak Trnava players
FK Sūduva Marijampolė players
Puszcza Niepołomice players
Stal Stalowa Wola players
Slovak Super Liga players
A Lyga players
I liga players
III liga players
Slovak expatriate footballers
Expatriate footballers in Lithuania
Expatriate footballers in Poland
Slovak expatriate sportspeople in Lithuania
Slovak expatriate sportspeople in Poland
People from Myjava
Sportspeople from the Trenčín Region